Brian John Poldberg (born May 16, 1957) is a retired American professional baseball coach and manager. From 2014 to 2021, he managed the Omaha Storm Chasers, the Triple-A affiliate of the Kansas City Royals.

Biography
Poldberg was born in Omaha, Nebraska. He played a total of six seasons in the New York Yankees and Kansas City Royals minor league systems, then began his coaching career in 1987. He has held several managing and coaching positions in the minor leagues. He is known for his exhaustive work with catchers. Poldberg resides in Carter Lake, Iowa, and he has spent 20 years with the Royals organization. From 2004 to 2007, Poldberg served in various coaching roles with the major league team. Before taking the position with Omaha, Poldberg was the manager for the Northwest Arkansas Naturals, the Double-A affiliate of the Royals, from 2008 to 2013. On September 23, 2021, Poldberg announced that he would retire at the end of the 2021 season.

References

External links

1957 births
Living people
Sportspeople from Omaha, Nebraska
Baseball coaches from Nebraska
Baseball players from Nebraska
Major League Baseball bullpen coaches
Kansas City Royals coaches
Greensboro Hornets players
Nashville Sounds players
Omaha Royals players
Appleton Foxes players
Eugene Emeralds managers
Minor league baseball coaches